Mohini (1919 in Orissa, India - 1951 in Assam, India) was an Indian actress of the Assamese cinema.

Filmography:

Manomati (1941)
Heer
Indramalati (1939)
Laaz Ke (1938)
Gaan (1938)
Aayan (1938)
Torali (1938)
Mansi (1937)
Devdas... Chandramukhi
Jaanu (1936)

1919 births
1951 deaths
Actresses in Assamese cinema
Indian film actresses
20th-century Indian actresses